Sir Colin Archibald Sinclair  (24 December 187617 March 1956) was an Australian politician.

Early life
Sinclair was born in Inverell, New South Wales and educated at the New England Grammar School, Armidale and the University of Sydney (BA 1899, LLB 1905). He married Edith Grant in 1916.

Sinclair was elected as the member for Namoi in the New South Wales Legislative Assembly in 1932, and was Secretary for Lands from February 1938 to November 1940, when he resigned after suggestions that he had a conflict of interest, as a result of his recent appointment as a director of the Bank of New South Wales. He did not run for re-election in Namoi in 1941.

Sinclair was president of the Royal Agricultural Society of New South Wales from 1943 to 1954 and President of the Bank of New South Wales from 1952 to 1954. He also served as a president of the Australian Club.  He died in Sydney. Sinclair was appointed a Knight Commander of the Order of the British Empire (KBE) in the 1953 New Year Honours.

References

 

1876 births
1956 deaths
Australian pastoralists
National Party of Australia members of the Parliament of New South Wales
Members of the New South Wales Legislative Assembly
Australian Knights Commander of the Order of the British Empire
Australian politicians awarded knighthoods
University of Sydney alumni
Presidents of the Bank of New South Wales